The Tailor of Gloucester is a television Christmas special first broadcast on 28 December 1989 on ITV. It is based on the children's story by Beatrix Potter.

Plot
The film tells the story of a poor tailor, his cat, and the mice that live in his shop. He has many scraps of cloth and ribbons left over that are too small for any practical use. The mice take these and make fine clothes for themselves.

The tailor sends his cat Simpkin to buy food and a twist of cherry-coloured silk for a coat the mayor has commissioned for his wedding, which will take place on Christmas morning.

While the cat is gone, he frees the mice from teacups where Simpkin has imprisoned them. When Simpkin returns and finds his mice gone, he hides the twist in anger.

When the tailor falls ill, the mice save the day by completing the coat. (One buttonhole remains incomplete because the mice run out of twist).

Cast
Ian Holm as The Tailor of Gloucester
Thora Hird as The Mayor's Housekeeper
Jude Law as the Mayor's Stableboy
Barry Ingham as the Mayor
Other performers: Benjamin Luxon, Francois Testory

References

External links

ITV children's television shows
Christmas television specials
1989 television films
1989 films
Beatrix Potter
Films based on children's books
1980s English-language films